The William J. Burns House is a historic house located at 47 South Washington Drive in Sarasota, Florida. It is locally significant as an excellent example of the Mediterranean Revival style, as well as the work of local architect Thomas Reed Martin.

Description and history 
It is a 2-story, Mediterranean Revival style house with an irregular floor plan. It rests on a concrete foundation and has exterior walls of stucco. Most of the house is covered with hipped roof segments, surfaced with clay barrel tiles. A few areas of the roof are flat due to its extensive use of built-up roofing material. Scuppers are placed right below the roof line at intervals around the house.

It was added to the National Register of Historic Places on March 21, 1997.

References and external links

 Sarasota County listings at National Register of Historic Places
 William J. Burns House at Portal of Historic Resources, State of Florida

Houses in Sarasota, Florida
Houses on the National Register of Historic Places in Sarasota County, Florida
Mediterranean Revival architecture in Florida
Houses completed in 1927